Woody Woodpecker's Nuthouse Coaster was a junior roller coaster located at Universal Studios Florida. It was the park's first roller coaster and the first roller coaster constructed at Universal Orlando Resort. The coaster was built in 1999, between the outside queue area for E.T. Adventure and the original location of Hard Rock Cafe. The premise of the ride was that guests were going on a wild ride through Woody Woodpecker's Nut Factory. The coaster was included in the original plans for the construction of Universal Studios Dubailand before the proposed park was scrapped.

History
On May 26, 1998, Universal announced plans to introduce a new Woody Woodpecker's KidZone area featuring Woody Woodpecker's Nuthouse Coaster and Curious George Goes to Town at its Orlando theme park location. They were built near other family attractions, such as A Day in the Park with Barney and Fievel's Playland, and are aimed at a younger audience between the ages of 5 and 12. Woody Woodpecker's Nuthouse Coaster opened on March 13, 1999. On November 1, 2022, Universal Studios Florida announced that the coaster, alongside Fievel's Playland, DreamWorks Destination, Curious George Goes to Town, and Shrek and Donkey's Meet and Greet, would close permanently on January 16, 2023, with its last day of operation on January 15, 2023. It was rumored that the coaster will be re-themed to DreamWorks’s Trolls.

Summary

Queue
As guests entered the queue, they passed Woody Woodpecker's insignia, along with certain bells which made various noises which guests could pull. They also passed a sign where Splinter and Knothead, Woody's niece and nephew, were arguing about who would first sign it. Guests then entered the factory, where they lined up in rows, and soon entered the ride vehicles.

Ride
After guests were seated and Woody's assistants had pushed down their lap bars, a bell rang and the ride train left the station and started to climb a lift. As it neared the top, riders had a full view of KidZone. At the top, a sign read "Ready or nut...Here we go!" and Woody (voiced by Billy West) could be heard saying "Guess who?", and then did his famous laugh. The vehicle went down a winding drop and went up a hill and did a smaller drop and went in multiple winding turns before coming to a complete stop with signs in front of it which read "Stop! Track ends! Now!" The vehicle then came back to the station and guests exited.

Gallery

Incident
On June 19, 2006, a 4-year-old girl injured one of her feet while exiting the train. She was taken to the hospital to be treated for cuts on her foot. Reports said that the girl's foot got stuck between the train and platform. Her foot was freed, but Universal closed the coaster so that staff could examine the ride. The attraction reopened the next day on June 20.

References

External links

Roller coasters in Orlando, Florida
Roller coasters introduced in 1999
Roller coasters that closed in 2023
Woody Woodpecker
Roller coasters operated by Universal Parks & Resorts
Universal Studios Florida
Universal Studios Dubailand
Universal Parks & Resorts attractions by name
Amusement rides based on film franchises
1999 establishments in Florida
2023 disestablishments in Florida